Vice Admiral Fawcet Wray DSO (1873 – 1932) was a senior Royal Navy officer.

Naval career
Born on 25 September 1873, Fawcet Wray was educated at Bedford School and at Britannia Royal Naval College. He was promoted to the rank of lieutenant in 1894 and specialised in Gunnery. He was Flag Commander to Lord Charles Beresford between 1905 and 1908, commanded HMS Foresight between 1909 and 1910, HMS Defence between 1913 and 1914, and HMS Talbot in 1915 during the Gallipoli Campaign, for which he was commended by King George V and awarded the Distinguished Service Order. He commanded HMS Drake between 1916 and 1917, and HMS Berwick and HMS Caesar in 1918.

Captain Fawcet Wray was promoted to the rank of Rear Admiral on 2 May 1922 and to the rank of Vice Admiral on 2 July 1927. He died in Kitzbühel, Austria, on 4 March 1932. The Times reported that he collapsed whilst skiing and died almost instantly.

References

Fawcet Wray at the Dreadnought Project

1873 births
1932 deaths
People educated at Bedford School
Royal Navy admirals
Companions of the Distinguished Service Order
Royal Navy personnel of World War I